National Conference may refer to:

Political reconstruction/political parties

India
Jammu & Kashmir National Conference, the largest political party in Jammu and Kashmir, India
Manipur National Conference, a political party in the Indian state of Manipur that was formed in 2002
Indian National Conference, a national political party

Libya
Libyan National Conference, for organising elections, a new constitution and peace in 2019 in Libya

Sports
Conference National, the top division of the Football Conference in England
National Conference League, the top league in the pyramid of amateur rugby leagues run by the British Amateur Rugby League Association (BARLA)
National Football Conference (NFC) in the National Football League
National Conference in Arena Football League (1987–2008)
National Conference (California), a U.S. high-school athletic conference

See also
MENC: The National Association for Music Education, an American organization for music educators
National Conference on Undergraduate Research, an organization that promotes undergraduate research in universities throughout the United States
National Conference of Bar Examiners, an American organization that develops standardized tests for lawyers
National Conference of Synagogue Youth, an Orthodox Jewish youth group
National Panhellenic Conference, an umbrella organization for 26 inter/national women's sororities in North America
Conference